Christian Fredrik Jebe (June 23, 1876 – November 30, 1961) was a Norwegian sailor who competed in the 1912 Summer Olympics. He was a crew member of the Norwegian boat Taifun, which won the gold medal in the 8 metre class.

References

External links
profile

1876 births
1961 deaths
Norwegian male sailors (sport)
Sailors at the 1912 Summer Olympics – 8 Metre
Olympic sailors of Norway
Olympic gold medalists for Norway
Olympic medalists in sailing
Medalists at the 1912 Summer Olympics